Brown Passage is a deep (up to 200 m) ocean channel connecting the western offshore waters of Hecate Strait and Dixon Entrance on the Pacific continental shelf with the eastern inland waters  of  Chatham  Sound  in  the North Coast of British Columbia, Canada. 

Located between Dundas and Stephens Islands, the passage is part of the main commercial approach to Prince Rupert. The western entrance is guarded by the Triple Island Lighthouse.

Brown Passage was named in July 1793 by Captain Vancouver, after Captain William Brown, of the Butterworth, which vessel Vancouver met with at the north end of Stephens Island on 21 July 1793.

References 

Straits of British Columbia
North Coast of British Columbia